Sabrage  is a technique for opening a champagne bottle with a saber, used for ceremonial occasions. The wielder slides the saber along the body seam of the bottle to the lip to break the top of the neck away, leaving the neck of the bottle open and ready to pour. The force of the blunt side of the blade hitting the lip breaks the glass to separate the collar from the neck of the bottle. One does not use the sharp side of the blade. The cork and collar remain together after separating from the neck.

History
The technique became popular in France when the army of Napoleon visited many of the aristocratic domains. It was just after the French Revolution and the saber was the weapon of choice for Napoleon's light cavalry (the Hussars). Napoleon's spectacular victories across all Europe gave them plenty of reason to celebrate. During these parties the cavalry would open the champagne with their sabers. Napoleon, who was known to have said, "I drink champagne when I win, to celebrate... and I drink champagne when I lose, to console myself", may have encouraged this.

There are many stories about this tradition. One of the more spirited tales is that of Madame Clicquot, who had inherited her husband's small champagne house at the age of 27. She used to entertain Napoleon's officers in her vineyard, and as they rode off in the early morning with their complimentary bottle of champagne, they would open it with their saber to impress the rich young widow.

Champagne sword

A champagne sword (sabre à champagne) is an instrument specially made for sabrage. The edges of the blade used should be blunt; a sharpened edge is unnecessary because in sabrage it is the impact that is important. If using a sword with a sharp blade then the flat blunt back of the blade is used. A champagne bottle can be opened with a spoon, edge of modern mobile phone or other similar item using the same method.

The bottle neck is held at an angle of approximately 20 degrees and the sword is cast down on it. The experienced sommelier can open the bottle with little loss of champagne. However, it is advised to allow a small flow in order to wash away any loose shards of glass that may be adhering to the neck. The first glass poured should also be checked for small glass shards.

Physics

A champagne bottle holds a considerable amount of pressure. With early designs, bottles tended to explode and the manufacturers kept making them thicker until they could contain the pressure caused by the release of carbon dioxide during the secondary fermentation.

At the opening of the bottle, there is a lip that creates a stress concentration. On the vertical seam of the bottle there is a thin, faintly visible, prepared seam, which creates a second stress concentration. At the intersection of the seam and the lip, both stress concentrations combine and the strength of the glass is reduced by more than fifty percent. The impact of the saber on this weak point creates a crack that rapidly propagates through the glass, fueled by the momentum of the saber and the pressure in the bottle.

Records
The greatest number of champagne bottles sabered in one minute to be officially recognized by the Guinness Book of World Records is 68 and was achieved by Mirko Rainer (CH) at the Show Dei Record by Gerry Scotti, in Milan, Italy on 3 February 2023. Rainer used his own design MRK-Sabre à Champagne. He beat the previous record of 66 held by Ashrita Furman, who managed this feat on 2 August 2015 at the Sri Chinmoy Centre, Jamaica, Queens.

The greatest number of champagne bottles sabered simultaneously was 623. It was officially recognised a world record by an occasion of the Sciabolata del Santero in Santo Stefano Belbo in Italy in June 2016.

References

External links
 
Champagne sword article on Wired News

Champagne (wine)
Etiquette
Sparkling wines
Sabres